Gregorio Compagni, O.P. (1640–1705) was a Roman Catholic prelate who served as Bishop of Larino (1703–1705) and Bishop of Sansepolcro (1696–1705).

Biography
Gregorio Compagni was born in Rome, Italy on 3 September 1640 and ordained a priest in the Order of Preachers. On 2 January 1696, he was appointed Bishop of Borgo San Sepolcro by Pope Innocent XII. On 29 January 1696, he was consecrated bishop by Pier Matteo Petrucci, Cardinal-Priest of San Marcello, with Prospero Bottini, Titular Archbishop of Myra, and Giovanni Battista Visconti Aicardi, Bishop of Novara, serving as co-consecrators. On 25 June 1703, he was transferred by Pope Clement XI to the diocese of Larino. He served as Bishop of Larino until his death on 17 September 1705.

References

17th-century Italian Roman Catholic bishops
18th-century Italian Roman Catholic bishops
Bishops appointed by Pope Innocent XII
Bishops appointed by Pope Clement XI
1640 births
1705 deaths
Dominican bishops